The 2003–04 Armenian Hockey League season was the third season of the Armenian Hockey League, the top level of ice hockey in Armenia. Four teams participated in the league, and Dinamo Yerevan won the championship.

Standings

External links
Season on hockeyarchives.info

Armenian Hockey League
2003 in Armenian sport
2004 in Armenian sport
Armenian Hockey League seasons